Luys Foundation is an Armenian foundation that is tasked with developing Armenia by creating a stronger presence of Armenia among world's leading creative thinkers and innovators. Its mission is threefold: Learn, Do, Co-Create. The first one aims at increasing the number of Armenian students at world's leading universities by providing financial support and mentoring to prospective students. The "Do" part uses the knowledge and connections of Luys scholars to develop Armenia. The "Co-Create" part mobilizes the youth to seek and find solutions to real-world problems through co-creation and innovative approaches.

References

Armenian culture